Underbelly Files: The Man Who Got Away is an Australian made-for-television movie that aired on 21 February 2011 on the Nine Network. It is the third of four television movies in the Underbelly Files series, the other three being Tell Them Lucifer was Here, Infiltration, and Chopper. It recounts the true story of British-Australian drug smuggler David McMillan, the only man ever to escape from Bangkok's Klong Prem prison.

Synopsis
The Man Who Got Away tells the true story of British-Australian drug smuggler David McMillan. McMillan came from a privileged background, but chose a life of crime, which put him on Interpol's Top Ten Most Wanted list. The love of his life was also his partner in crime, Clelia Vigano. Together McMillan and Vigano were an unstoppable force, or so they thought.

Cast

 Toby Schmitz as David McMillan
 Claire van der Boom as Clelia Vigano
 Jeremy Sims as Tony Moynihan
 Aaron Jeffery as Geoff Leyland
 Nicholas Eadie
 Brendan Cowell
 Freya Stafford
 Josh Lawson as Michael Sullivan
 John Orcsik
 Heather Mitchell
 Deidre Rubenstein
 Aaron Jakubenko as cop #1
 Toby Wallace
William Zappa

Ratings
The Man Who Got Away aired on 21 February 2011 at 8:30pm and attracted an audience of 1.015 million viewers which ranked it the #9 rating show for that night. However it was down from the previous two Underbelly telemovies and is the lowest figure for a Underbelly telemovie or episode of the shows franchise.

References

Nine Network original programming
Films about organised crime in Australia
Films about the illegal drug trade
2011 films
Films directed by Cherie Nowlan